Vuger or Vugrovec is a stream located in Zagreb, Croatia, in the district of Sesvete. Its name is connected to the settlement of Vugrovec, which is located near the stream's source. The lower basin of Vuger, from its confluence with Srednjak to its mouth at the Rijeka stream, is also called Kostanić. In the Middle Ages, Kostanić and Srednjak were together known as the Sopnica river.

Vuger is classified as a Class I waterflow and a potential flood hazard. It is one of the few streams in Zagreb that have not been covered as of yet. Part of the stream forms the western boundary of Sesvete's historic core.

References 

Rivers of Croatia
Geography of Zagreb